Pimelea imbricata is a species of flowering plant in the family Thymelaeaceae and is native to the southwest of Western Australia and south-eastern South Australia. It is a shrub with narrowly elliptic leaves and erect, compact clusters of white or pink flowers surrounded by 10 to 22 green or red to purple involucral bracts.

Description
Flowering occurs from August to March with a peak from September to January.

Taxonomy
Pimelea imbricata was first formally described in 1810 by Robert  Brown in his book Prodromus Florae Novae Hollandiae et Insulae Van Diemen. The specific epithet (imbricata) means "imbricate".

The names of 5 varieties of P. imbricata have been accepted by the Australian Plant Census:
 Pimelea imbricata R.Br. var. imbricata has stems that are hairy near the pale to deep pink flowers, the style part of the floral tube densely hairy.

 Pimelea imbricata var. major (Meisn.) Rye has glabrous stems, the style part of the floral tube sparsely to moderately hairy.

 Pimelea imbricata var. petraea (Meisn.)

 Pimelea imbricata var. piligera  (Benth.)

Distribution and habitat
This pimelea is widespread in the south-west of Western Australia and the south-east of South Australia. The variety imbricata grows on granite outcrops and in swamps from near Point D'Entrecasteaux east to Albany in the Avon Wheatbelt, Esperance Plains, Jarrah Forest, Mallee and Warren bioregions of south-western Australia. Variety major is restricted to the coastal plain, growing in winter-wet areas and temporary watercourses from near Gingin to Serpentine in the Jarrah Forest and Swan Coastal Plain bioregions. Variety petraea occurs in the south-east of South Australia, including on the Eyre and Yorke Peninsulas, Kangaroo Island and Flinders Ranges. Variety piligera often grows near granite rocks or in winter-wet areas and is found from the Murchison River to Margaret River and along the south coast of Western Australia to near Esperance in the Avon Wheatbelt, Coolgardie, Esperance Plains, Geraldton Sandplains, Jarrah Forest, Mallee, Murchison, Swan Coastal Plain and Warren bioregions. Variety simulans occurs between Wongan Hills and Bruce Rock in the Avon Wheatbelt bioregion of south-western Western Australia.

Conservation status
All four varieties of P. imbricata found in Western Australian are listed as "not threatened" by the Government of Western Australia Department of Biodiversity, Conservation and Attractions,

References

imbricata
Malvales of Australia
Taxa named by Robert Brown (botanist, born 1773)
Plants described in 1810
Flora of Western Australia
Flora of South Australia